Nicolò Spinola (1677 in Genoa – 1743 in Genoa) was the 155th Doge of the Republic of Genoa and king of Corsica.

Biography 
Spinola was appointed doge of Genoa in the election of 16 February 1740, the one hundred and tenth in biennial succession and the one hundred and fifty-fifth in republican history. As doge he was also invested with the related biennial office of king of Corsica. When the dogal office ceased on 16 February 1742, Nicolò Spinola retired to private life, and died during 1743.

See also 

 Republic of Genoa
 Doge of Genoa
 House of Spinola

References 

18th-century Doges of Genoa
1677 births
1743 deaths